Mashhadi Kandi may refer to:
 Mashhadi Kandi, East Azerbaijan
 Mashhadi Kandi, West Azerbaijan